The 1983 NCAA Division I baseball tournament was played at the end of the 1983 NCAA Division I baseball season to determine the national champion of college baseball.  The tournament concluded with eight teams competing in the College World Series, a double-elimination tournament in its thirty seventh year.  Eight regional competitions were held to determine the participants in the final event.  Six regions held a four team, double-elimination tournament while two regions included six teams, resulting in 36 teams participating in the tournament at the conclusion of their regular season, and in some cases, after a conference tournament.  The thirty-seventh tournament's champion was Texas, coached by Cliff Gustafson.  The Most Outstanding Player was Calvin Schiraldi of Texas.

National seeds
Bold indicates CWS participant.
BYU
Florida State
Michigan
Stanford
Texas

Regionals
The opening rounds of the tournament were played at eight regional sites across the country, six consisting of four teams and two of six teams. The winners of each Regional advanced to the College World Series.

Bold indicates winner.

Central Regional at Austin, TX

East Regional at Chapel Hill, NC

Mideast Regional at Ann Arbor, MI

Midwest Regional at Stillwater, OK

Northeast Regional at Orono, ME

South Regional at Tallahassee, FL

West I Regional at Stanford, CA

West II Regional at Tempe, AZ

College World Series

Participants

Results

Bracket

Game results

 Texas was the last school to go undefeated in the CWS under the true double-elimination format, which was used from 1950 through 1987. No CWS team would go undefeated again until LSU in 1991.

All-Tournament Team
The following players were members of the All-Tournament Team.

Notable players
 Alabama: Dave Magadan, Craig Shipley
 Arizona State: Chris Beasley, Barry Bonds, Doug Henry, Oddibe McDowell, Don Wakamatsu
 James Madison: 
 Maine: Bill Swift
 Michigan: Scott Kamieniecki, Barry Larkin, Chris Sabo, Gary Wayne
 Oklahoma State: Carlos Diaz, John Farrell, Gary Green, Mike Henneman, Pete Incaviglia, Robbie Wine
 Stanford: Mike Aldrete, Jeff Ballard, Mark Davis, Pete Stanicek
 Texas: Billy Bates, Mike Brumley, Mike Capel, Roger Clemens, Jeff Hearron, Bruce Ruffin, Calvin Schiraldi, Jose Tolentino

References

NCAA Division I Baseball Championship
Tournament
Baseball in Austin, Texas
NCAA Division I baseball tournament